Ondes is a commune in southwestern France. Ondes or Öndeş may also refer to
ondes Martenot, an early electronic musical instrument 
Selen Öndeş (born 1988), Turkish volleyball player
Saint-Benoît-des-Ondes, a commune in northwestern France
Saint-Méloir-des-Ondes, a commune in northwestern France
San Martín de Ondes, a parish in northern Spain